First seed Alexander Zverev won the tournament, defeating third seed Félix Auger-Aliassime 6–3, 6–3 in the final. This was the first edition of the tournament, primarily organised due to the cancellation of many tournaments in 2020, due to the COVID-19 pandemic.

Seeds
The top four seeds received a bye into the second round.

Draw

Finals

Top half

Bottom half

Qualifying

Seeds

Qualifiers

Lucky losers

Qualifying draw

First qualifier

Second qualifier

Third qualifier

Fourth qualifier

References

External links
 Main draw
 Qualifying draw

2020 ATP Tour